Association française des femmes diplômées des universités (AFFDU) is a recognized association, which was created in 1920. This French section of the International Federation of Academic Women (IFUW), is an NGO. Moreover, AFFDU has a consultative status with the United Nations. The affiliation of AFFDU to the European Women's Group and the UWE Group (University Women of Europe), in the Council of Europe gives to it an international status. Marie-José Jonczy, a lawyer, is the current president of AFFDU and she has directed the activities of this association.

Foundation 
The AFFDU was founded in France after the First World War, notably thanks to scientist Marie Curie and historian Jeanne Chaton. The association brings together women graduates who want to defend equality, as well as access to education for women in all fields. Its objective is to defend equal access to education for female graduates. The association's actions seek to promote all female graduates or students in higher education by enabling them to access scholarships or financial aid.

Missions 
AFFDU operates within a framework of national and international networks. It is involved in actions aimed at the education of women. It is also involved in the promotion of educated women. The association consists of women graduates of higher education (universities, specialty institutions and engineering schools).

Distinctions 
In 2009, the association received the Irène Joliot-Curie Prize for its educational, cultural and mentorship activities.

Selected activities 
AFFDU has international activities not only in France but also in Quebec, Canada. The newspaper Le Soleil has published about the activities of this association in Quebec. Another activity of AFFDU is to encourage the acquisition of French by students, which can help them to better succeed in their studies. This association also offers access to contact information. The activities of AFFDU encourage collaboration among women who have graduated from universities.

Notes

References 
About AFFDU on the website of Ministry of higher education, research and innovation, 2013
 About AFFDU, Journal des Femmes, 2011
About AFFDU on the website of centre Hubertine Auclert, visited in 2017
AFDU receives the Irène Joliot Curie prize, 2009 
About AFFDU, on the website of DLF, visited in 2017
Femmes et relations internationales au XXe siècle, Jean-Marc Delaunay, publisher: Presses Sorbonne Nouvelle, p. 256, 2009

External links 
 Official site

Non-profit organizations based in France
Organizations based in Paris
Women's organizations based in France
Women in Paris